This is a list of the 473 butterfly species which are found in Europe sensu lato (including Russia west of the Urals and the Caucasus region). Europe forms the western part of the Palearctic biogeographical zone and includes:
Euro-Siberian region
The boreal and temperate Euro-Siberian region transitions from tundra and taiga in northern Russia and Scandinavia. South of the taiga is a belt of temperate broadleaf and mixed forests and temperate coniferous forests.
North and Central Europe
Mediterranean Basin ecoregions border the Mediterranean Sea in southern Europe.

The list is divided into five sections:
List of butterflies of Europe (Papilionidae) - 13 species
List of butterflies of Europe (Pieridae) - 50 species
List of butterflies of Europe (Nymphalidae) - 232 species
List of butterflies of Europe (Lycaenidae) - 129 species
List of butterflies of Europe (Hesperiidae) - 47 species
List of butterflies of Europe (Riodinidae) – 1 species

References
Kudrna O., Ed. Butterflies of Europe. Aula Verlag, Wiesbaden. 8 volumes
O. Karsholt, J. Razowski (eds.), 1996. The Lepidoptera of Europe: a distributional checklist Stenstrup : Apollo Books, 1996. 
Higgins, L.G., 1975. The Classification of European Butterflies. London, Collins, 320 pp.
Higgins, L.G. & Riley, N.D. A Field Guide to the Butterflies of Britain and Europe. Collins 
Pavel Y. Gorbunov 2001. The Butterflies of Russia: Classification, Genitalia, Keys for Identification: Lepidoptera: Hesperioidea and Papilionoidea. Tezis Izdatel Stvo 
Kudrna, O.; Harpke, A.; Lux, K.; Pennerstorfer, J.; Schweiger, O.; Settele, J. & M. Wiemers (2011): Distribution Atlas of Butterflies in Europe. 576 S.; Halle a.d. Saale (Gesellschaft für Schmetterlingsschutz e.V.)
Bozano, G.C. Guide to the Butterflies of the Palearctic Region. Milan: Omnes Artes. incomplete (parts in progress) some parts available as e-books.
Tshikolovets, V.V. Butterflies of Europe and Mediterranean Area. Tshikolovets, Pardubice

External links
Butterflies of the Caucasus region and south of Russia
Euroleps Butterflies of the Palearctic
Bestimmungshilfe für die in Europa nachgewiesenen Schmetterlingsarten
Insecta.pro >Catalogue> Europe> 1000 per page
Seitz, A. Die Gross-Schmetterlinge der Erde 13: Die Palaearktischen Tagfalter. Plates
Seitz, A. Die Gross-Schmetterlinge der Erde 13: Die Palaearktischen Tagfalter. Text (as search available pdf pdf)

Fauna Europaea
Taxonomic checklist of European butterflies

 
Europe